Kwame Owusu Boateng (born 21 November 1998) is an English professional footballer who plays as a right back for Guiseley.

Career
Born in London, Boateng spent four years with Bradford City, making two appearances in the Football League Trophy during the 2016–17 season. By February 2018 he was playing for Whitkirk Wanderers in the Leeds Combination League. He began the 2018–19 season with Harrogate Town, before moving to Guiseley in February 2019. On 9 March 2019, he was loaned out for one month to Farsley Celtic and helped the team gain promotion. He left Guiseley in May 2019, before returning to Farsley Celtic on a permanent basis in June 2019.

On 31 August 2019, he joined Ossett United on a dual registration, making 2 league appearances. He later joined Albion Sports and then Goole in February 2020.

In September 2020 he signed for Welsh club The New Saints.  He left the club in June 2021.

On 10 December 2021, he joined Sheffield Wednesday, playing with the club's under-23 squad. On 16 March 2022, manager Darren Moore announced he would be leaving the club upon the expiry of his contract.

On 27 September 2022, he re-joined Guiseley.

Career statistics

References

1998 births
Living people
English footballers
Bradford City A.F.C. players
Harrogate Town A.F.C. players
Guiseley A.F.C. players
Farsley Celtic F.C. players
Ossett United F.C. players
Albion Sports A.F.C. players
Goole A.F.C. players
The New Saints F.C. players
Sheffield Wednesday F.C. players
Association football fullbacks
Cymru Premier players